Muya is a rural locality (a settlement) in Muysky District, Republic of Buryatia, Russia. The population was 184 as of 2010. There are 8 streets.

Geography 
Muya is located 66 km east of Taksimo (the district's administrative centre) by road. Ust-Muya is the nearest rural locality.

References 

Rural localities in Muysky District